Saskatoon Massey Place was a provincial electoral district for the Legislative Assembly of Saskatchewan, Canada. This district included the neighbourhoods of Dundonald, Caswell Hill, Massey Place, Hampton Village, Westview, and Hudson Bay Park. The area previously represented by this district is now represented by Saskatoon Westview and Saskatoon Centre.

Created by the Representation Act, 1994 (Saskatchewan) as "Saskatoon Mount Royal", it was renamed "Saskatoon Massey Place" through the Representation Act, 2002 (Saskatchewan). It was last contested in the 2011 provincial election.

Members of the Legislative Assembly

Election results

Saskatoon Mount Royal (1995 – 2003)

External links 
Website of the Legislative Assembly of Saskatchewan
Elections Saskatchewan: Official Results of the 2007 Provincial Election
Elections Saskatchewan - Official Results of the 2011 Provincial Election
Saskatchewan Archives Board – Election Results By Electoral Division

Former provincial electoral districts of Saskatchewan
Politics of Saskatoon